Pompeii is an EP by Beirut, released in 2007. It features only the work of Zach Condon and pre-dates the Gulag Orkestar debut album. While initially only available exclusively through eMusic and Rough Trade Digital, it later could be found on iTunes and Amazon. The Amazon version included a third song called "Monna Pomona". The album cover features Zach Condon (on the left) and his younger brother Ross Condon (on the right).

Track listing

References

2007 EPs
Pompeii